B Collision or (B is for Banjo), or (B sides), or (Bill), or perhaps more accurately (...the eschatology of Bluegrass) is David Crowder Band's second studio EP. It is a collection of new songs, remixes, and live songs.

Track listing

Chart Positions

References 

David Crowder Band albums
2006 EPs